Imp Island may refer to:

 Imp Island (Antarctica), one of the Vardim Rocks
 Imp Island (Western Australia) in the Kimberley region (see Sortable list of islands of Western Australia)